Shawkat Ara Begum is a Bangladesh Awami League politician and the former Member of Bangladesh Parliament from a reserved seat.

Early life
Begum was born on 31 January 1964. She has a law degree.

Career
Begum was elected to parliament from reserved seat in Nawabganj as a Bangladesh Awami League candidate in 2009.

References

Awami League politicians
Living people
Women members of the Jatiya Sangsad
9th Jatiya Sangsad members
1964 births
21st-century Bangladeshi women politicians
21st-century Bangladeshi politicians